The Poffenberger Road Bridge, near Jefferson, Maryland, is a wrought iron bridge by the Wrought Iron Bridge Company of Canton, Ohio. The bridge is similar to the Fourpoints Bridge elsewhere in Frederick County. The bridge is a single-span double-intersection Pratt truss. It was built circa 1878 and remains in daily use.

It was listed on the National Register of Historic Places in 1978.

See also
List of bridges documented by the Historic American Engineering Record in Maryland
List of bridges on the National Register of Historic Places in Maryland

References

External links

, including photo in 1977, at Maryland Historical Trust

Wrought iron bridges in the United States
Road bridges on the National Register of Historic Places in Maryland
Bridges in Frederick County, Maryland
Bridges completed in 1878
Historic American Engineering Record in Maryland
National Register of Historic Places in Frederick County, Maryland
Pratt truss bridges in the United States